Ivan Todorov (born 27 March 1987) is a Bulgarian footballer who currently plays as a defender for Kariana Erden.

Career 
The defender played previously for Levski Sofia and Slavia Sofia in the A PFG. He also played for the Bulgarian lower league clubs Rodopa Smolyan, Vidima-Rakovski, Chernomorets Pomorie and OFC Sliven 2000.

Todorov played in Austria for WSC Hertha Wels.

In July 2017, Todorov joined Kariana Erden.

References

1987 births
Living people
Bulgarian footballers
First Professional Football League (Bulgaria) players
Second Professional Football League (Bulgaria) players
PFC Levski Sofia players
PFC Rodopa Smolyan players
PFC Vidima-Rakovski Sevlievo players
FC Pomorie players
PFC Slavia Sofia players
OFC Sliven 2000 players
FC Kariana Erden players
Bulgarian expatriate footballers
Bulgarian expatriate sportspeople in Austria
Expatriate footballers in Austria
Association football defenders